The Smithson Baronetcy, of Stanwick in the County of York, is a title in the Baronetage of England. It was created on 2 August 1660 for Hugh Smithson (1598-1670) of Stanwick St John, Yorkshire. Sir Hugh Smithson, 3rd Baronet, married Elizabeth Langdale, daughter of Marmaduke Langdale, Baron Langdale. Sir Hugh Smithson, the fourth Baronet, married Lady Elizabeth Seymour, daughter of Algernon Seymour, 7th Duke of Somerset and heiress of the Percy family, Earls of Northumberland. In 1749 the Duke of Somerset was created Earl of Northumberland, with remainder to his son-in-law Sir Hugh Smithson, who succeeded as second Earl on his father-in-law's death in 1750. He assumed the surname of Percy and was created Duke of Northumberland in 1766. The baronetcy remains merged with the dukedom.

Smithsonian Institution in Washington DC was founded with the legacy of James Smithson son Sir Hugh, 4th Baronet (Hugh Percy, 1st Duke of Northumberland).

Smithson baronets of Stanwick (1660)
Sir Hugh Smithson, 1st Baronet (–1670)
Sir Jerome Smithson, 2nd Baronet (–1684)
Sir Hugh Smithson, 3rd Baronet (1657–1729)
Langdale Smithson
Sir Hugh Smithson (later Percy), 4th Baronet (c.1714–1786) (succeeded as Earl of Northumberland in 1750 and created Duke of Northumberland in 1766)

For further succession, see Duke of Northumberland.

Arms

The Arms of Smithson of Stanwick, Yorkshire (ancient) are blazoned Argent, a chevron engrailed sable between three oak leaves erect slipped vert

The arms of the Smithson baronets of Stanwick are Or, on a chief embattled azure three suns proper.

See also
Earl of Northumberland
Duke of Northumberland
Duke of Somerset

Notes

References

Further reading
Smithson, George R., Genealogical notes memoirs of the Smithson family, London, 1906 (archive.org text)
De Fonblanque, Edward Barrington, Annals of the House of Percy, From the Conquest to the Opening of the Nineteenth Century, 2 Volumes, London, 1887
Volume 1 
Volume 2, Part 1
Volume 2, Part 2
Bulter, L., The Smithson Monuments at Stanwick, North Yorkshire, published in Journal of the Church Monument Society, Volume XV, 2000. 6pp, 4 b/w plates

Baronetcies in the Baronetage of England
1660 establishments in England